Asian Dreamer  is the twenty-seventh studio album released by the jazz fusion group Casiopea in 1994.
This album features re-arranged and re-recorded versions of their original songs with their second lineup (Yoshihiro Naruse on bass, Noriaki Kumagai on drums) of the band after their original, first lineup.

Track listing

Personnel
Issei Noro - Guitars
Minoru Mukaiya - Keyboards
Yoshihiro Naruse - Bass
Noriaki Kumagai - Drums

Production
Sound Produced - CASIOPEA
Executive Producer - Yoshiaki Mizutani, Yuzo Watanabe
Recording Director - Toshiyuki Yashiro

Recording Engineer - Koji Sugimori, Hiroyuki Shimura
Mixing Engineer - Koji Sugimori
Mastering Engineer - Tohru Kotetsu
Assistant Engineer - Kenji Igarashi, Tadashi Yamaguchi, Masashi Yanagisawa

Instruments Technician -  Yasushi Horiuchi, Hiroyuki Yamada
Basses Build Up Technician - Yoshiki Murayama

Art Direction & Design - Shigekazu Tsujimori
Digital Art & Design - Keiko Akiyama
Design - Koji Miyazaki
Photography - Junichi Takahashi, IPS, MON-TRESOR
Hair & Make Up - Eisuke Shibusawa
Stylist - Emiko Seki

Release history

References

External links
 

1994 albums
Casiopea albums
Pony Canyon albums